The list of Druze includes prominent Druze figures who are notable in their areas of expertise.

Literature
 Naim Araidi – Israeli writer and poet in Hebrew and Arabic.
 Reda Mansour – Israeli Hebrew poet and writer and former ambassador in Ecuador
 Rami Zeedan- Israeli Druze political scientist, historian, and author.
 Salman Masalha – Israeli poet, essayist and researcher
 Samih al-Qasim – Palestinian-Israeli poet.
 Sami Makarem – Lebanese-American writer and painter

Media
 Mona Abou Hamza – Lebanese TV presenter
 Raghida Dergham – Lebanese American journalist.
 Casey Kasem – American TV & radio presenter, of Lebanese descent.
 Nahida Nakad – Lebanese French senior correspondent and TV executive
 Faisal al-Qassem – Syrian television talkshow host
 Asmahan (Amaal al-Atrash) – Syrian Lebanese Egyptian female singer, and actress. 
 Farid al-Atrash – Syrian Lebanese Egyptian male singer, composer, and actor. 
 Ramy Ayach – Lebanese singer
 Fahd Ballan – Syrian male singer.

Politics

Canada
 Ziad Aboultaif – Canadian MP for Edmonton Manning.

Israel
 Labib Hussein Abu Rokan – Israeli MP and religious judge.
 Abdullah Abu Ma'aruf – Israeli MP and physician.
 Hamad Amar – Israeli MP.
 Assad Assad – Israeli MP, army colonel, and diplomat
 Zeidan Atashi – Israeli MP and diplomat
 Amal Nasser el-Din – Israeli MP and author
 Salah-Hassan Hanifes – Israeli MP
 Ayoob Kara – Israeli MP, deputy speaker, and deputy minister
 Jabr Moade – Israeli MP and deputy minister
 Gadeer Mreeh – Israeli MP and former television anchor
 Mohamed Nafa – Israeli MP
 Said Nafa – Israeli MP and lawyer
 Shachiv Shnaan – Israeli member of parliament
 Salah Tarif – Israeli minister, MP, and army captain
 Majalli Wahabi – Israeli MP, IDF lieutenant-colonel, and acting president

Lebanon
 Akram Chehayeb – Lebanese Minister and MP
 Ghazi Aridi – Lebanese minister and MP
 Majid Arslan – Lebanese Defense Minister for over 40 years
 Shakib Arslan – Lebanese politician, writer, poet and historian
 Talal Arslan – Lebanese minister and MP
 Fakhr-al-Din II – Ruler (emir) of Lebanon from 1590 to 1633; united Lebanon and parts of Syria and Palestine under his rule
 Kamal Jumblatt – Lebanese MP, minister, writer, author, and poet
 Walid Jumblatt – Lebanese minister and leader of the Progressive Socialist Party
 Marwan Hamadeh – Lebanese minister and MP
 Marwan Kheireddin – Lebanese minister
 Faisal Al Sayegh – Lebanese MP
 Wiam Wahhab – Lebanese Politician
 Hadi Aboul-Hosn – Lebanese MP

Syria
 Sultan Pasha al-Atrash – Syrian Leader & Commander of the Syrian Revolt.
 Mansur al-Atrash – Syrian politician, Interim head of state.
 Shibli al-Aysami – former Syrian Vice president and Gen Sec of the Ba'th Arab Socialist Party
 Issam Zahreddine – Major General of the Syrian Republican Guard who has played a major role in the Syrian Civil War, leading Syrian Government forces on several fronts.

Jordan 
 Ayman Safadi –  Deputy Prime Minister and Jordan's Minister of Foreign Affairs.

Venezuela
 Tarek El Aissami – Venezuelan interior and justice minister.

Religion 
 Suliman Bashear – Palestinian-Israeli scholar of Islam
 Al-Hakim bi-Amr Allah – central religious figure of the faith and sixth Imam-Caliph of the Fatimid Caliphate
 Hamza ibn-'Ali ibn-Ahmad – founding religious leader
 Amin Tarif (1898–1993) – Israeli religious leader
 Mowafak Tarif – Israeli religious leader
 Abu Mohammad Jawad Walieddine (1916–2012) – Head of Authority of Senior Sheikhs

Security
 Imad Fares – Israeli Brigadier General
 Salim Hatoum – Syrian Major. Led overthrow of the government of Amin al-Hafez in 1966. while historian Patrick Seale describes them "poor."
 Yousef Mishleb – Israeli general
 Nada Nadim Prouty – Syrian security agent
 Ghassan Alian – Commander of Golani brigade in IDF

Sports
 Zidan Amar – Israeli footballer. 
 Ahad Azam – Israeli footballer
 Wiyam Amashe – Israeli footballer
 Amir Nasar A Din – Israeli footballer
 Sari Falah – Israeli footballer
 Amir Halaby – Israeli footballer.
 Mahran Lala – Israeli footballer
 Nazar Mahmud – Israeli figure skater
 Raja Rafe – Syrian footballer
 Kenny Hasan Sayef – American-Israeli footballer.

Visual arts
 Farid Mansour (artist) – Lebanese Painter, and Sculptor 
 Nabil Kanso – Lebanese-American painter
 Michael Netzer (Nassar) – American-Israeli graphical artist

Others
 Azzam Azzam – Israeli textile worker, former Israeli prisoner in Egypt
 Angelina Fares – Israeli beauty pageant.
 Samir Kuntar – Lebanese militant. 
 Majdi Halabi – disappeared and  discovered Israeli soldier
 Amal Clooney – Lebanese-British lawyer, married to George Clooney
Khaled Camil Abou Chakra – Lebanese Architect, LEED Green Associate / Researcher in Construction & Architectural Sciences
 Nadia Aboulhosn – Lebanese-American plus-size model and blogger
 Emin Arslan – Born in current-day Lebanon (Ottoman Syria), diplomat, writer and editor

See also 
 List of Israeli Druze

References

Needs to be incorporated into the article 
24 <Balanced-4-Life: Before BurnOut. WestBow Press 2016 August> 
25 <Psychology of Terrorists: Profiling and CounterAction. Taylor & Francis Publishers, CRC Press, 2018 November>

Druze
+
Druze